Epicephala pyrrhogastra is a moth of the family Gracillariidae. It is known from South Africa, Namibia and Zimbabwe.

References

Epicephala
Lepidoptera of Namibia
Lepidoptera of South Africa
Lepidoptera of Zimbabwe
Moths of Sub-Saharan Africa
Moths described in 1908